Farnham Manor is a grade II listed house in Farnham, Suffolk, England. It is timber-framed and dates from at least 1602 based on a year marked on plasterwork in the house.

References 

Grade II listed buildings in Suffolk
Grade II listed houses
Farnham
Timber framed buildings in England
Buildings and structures completed in 1602